The Major Indoor Soccer League (MISL), originally known as the National Indoor Soccer League, was a professional indoor soccer league which began play in 2008. It was the third league to be known as the Major Indoor Soccer League after the MISL I and MISL II. The MISL name is arguably the most recognizable name in indoor soccer due to its history dating back to 1978. The league name and assets are currently owned by the United Soccer Leagues. The departure of six teams which joined the Professional Arena Soccer League (now the Major Arena Soccer League) after the 2013–14 season effectively ended the MISL.

History

Launch as NISL
The NISL was one of three leagues that organized in late 2008 after the demise of the second MISL; the other two being the PASL-Pro (an offshoot of the Premier Arena Soccer League) and the Xtreme Soccer League. The NISL and the XSL were more closely related, with both leagues first announcing four former MISL teams respectively and using the same game rules as the MISL.

Originally, five teams had been announced to play in the inaugural season; four who were in the previous MISL (Baltimore, Monterrey, Orlando Sharks, and Philadelphia)  and one formerly in the American Indoor Soccer League (Rockford). However, the Orlando Sharks were forced to go inactive because of scheduling conflicts with Amway Arena. Later, a second former AISL franchise, the Massachusetts Twisters, were brought in to take the place of the Sharks.

In July 2009, the XSL announced they were going on a one-year hiatus due to a lack of monetary backing. The NISL attempted to attract the former MISL teams from the folded XSL to join for the 2009–10 season, and succeeded in acquiring the Milwaukee Wave as a result. The other XSL franchises, minus the Chicago Storm, folded along with the XSL. Shortly after the Wave joined the NISL, the Massachusetts Twisters folded, leaving the 2009–10 season with only five teams again.

Shortly before the league launched its 2009–10 season, the opportunity arose to purchase the rights to the "Major Indoor Soccer League" name; the league successfully acquired the rights and immediately rebranded itself as the newest MISL.

The MISL expanded into Missouri (Kansas City area) and Omaha starting with the 2010–11 season.

Merger with I-League
For the 2010–11 season, the league consisted of only five teams, with the Rockford Rampage and Monterrey La Raza no longer active league members. On October 15, 2010, the Milwaukee Journal-Sentinel reported the exodus of the Philadelphia KiXX and the addition of a Chicago franchise.

In October 2010, the United Soccer Leagues (USL), which also oversees the men's USL Pro and USL Premier Development Leagues proposed a new league which was to begin play in the fall of 2011, the 'USL I-League. However, in May 2011, the USL, struggling to sign teams for the new league, agreed instead to take over operation of the MISL. Three teams from the proposed league were added: the Norfolk SharX, Rochester Lancers and Syracuse Silver Knights.

In June 2012, the MISL announced that a new Chicago franchise was awarded to Armando Gamboa and Dave Mokry for the 2012–13 season. The club was subsequently named the Chicago Soul, with the club making its home at the Sears Centre.
Meanwhile, the Norfolk SharX announced that the team would cease operations effective immediately because of financial difficulties.

Final season
A new incarnation of the St. Louis Ambush were announced as an expansion team in June 2013. This was St. Louis' first professional indoor soccer team since the St. Louis Steamers folded in 2006.

One day after the 2013–14 MISL Championship game, USL President Tim Holt released a video stating that the USL was reevaluating the MISL to create a more "sustainable" league that features the highest level of professional indoor soccer. He noted that the process would take "more than a few months" and that the possibility of not having a 2014–15 playing season existed.

In the following months, six of the seven teams from the final MISL season joined the Professional Arena Soccer League, which was renamed the Major Arena Soccer League.  This was the effective end of MISL III.

Commissioner

Teams

† Never played an NISL/MISL game

Championships

Average attendance

# A third "mini-game" had to decide the winner after one or more series were tied at 1 game a piece.

References

External links
MISL official website
Broadcast partner's official website

 
Defunct indoor soccer leagues in the United States
2008 establishments in the United States
2014 establishments in the United States